Carl Springer (November 10, 1910 – September 2, 1980) was an American speed skater. He competed in the men's 5000 metres event at the 1932 Winter Olympics.

References

1910 births
1980 deaths
American male speed skaters
Olympic speed skaters of the United States
Speed skaters at the 1932 Winter Olympics
Sportspeople from Brooklyn